The following lists events that happened during 1968 in Australia.

Incumbents

Monarch – Elizabeth II
Governor-General – Lord Casey
Prime Minister – John McEwen (until 10 January), then John Gorton
Deputy Prime Minister – John McEwen (from 10 January)
Opposition Leader – Gough Whitlam
Chief Justice – Sir Garfield Barwick

State and Territory Leaders
Premier of New South Wales – Robert Askin
Opposition Leader – Jack Renshaw (until 2 December), then Pat Hills
Premier of Queensland – Frank Nicklin (until 17 January), then Jack Pizzey (until 31 July), then Gordon Chalk (from 1 August until 8 August), then Joh Bjelke-Petersen
Opposition Leader – Jack Houston
Premier of South Australia – Don Dunstan (until 17 April), then Steele Hall
Opposition Leader – Steele Hall (until 17 April), then Don Dunstan
Premier of Tasmania – Eric Reece
Opposition Leader – Angus Bethune
Premier of Victoria – Sir Henry Bolte
Opposition Leader – Clyde Holding
Premier of Western Australia – David Brand
Opposition Leader – John Tonkin

Governors and Administrators
Governor of New South Wales – Sir Roden Cutler
Governor of Queensland – Sir Alan Mansfield
Governor of South Australia – Lieutenant General Sir Edric Bastyan (until 1 June), then Major General Sir James Harrison (from 4 December)
Governor of Tasmania – General Sir Charles Gairdner (until 11 July), then Lieutenant General Sir Edric Bastyan (from 2 December)
Governor of Victoria – Major General Sir Rohan Delacombe
Governor of Western Australia – Major General Sir Douglas Kendrew
Administrator of Nauru – Leslie King (until 30 January)
Administrator of Norfolk Island – Reginald Marsh (until June), then Robert Dalkin (from July)
Administrator of the Northern Territory – Roger Dean
Administrator of Papua and New Guinea – David Hay

Events
4 January – The search for the body of Prime Minister Harold Holt, who disappeared whilst swimming near Portsea, Victoria, is called off.
10 January – John Gorton is sworn in as Prime Minister of Australia after the disappearance of Harold Holt.
28 January – Members of English rock groups The Who and Small Faces are escorted by police from a plane at Melbourne's Essendon Airport, after the pilot diverts the flight citing the bands' behaviour.
1 April – American evangelist Billy Graham begins a tour of Australia.
17 April – A state election is held in South Australia. Steele Hall (Liberal and Country League) defeats Don Dunstan (ALP), and becomes Premier of South Australia.
8 April – Fluoridation of Sydney's water supply begins.
30 April – Jim Cairns unsuccessfully challenges Gough Whitlam for leadership of the Australian Labor Party.
1 May – The Duke of Edinburgh arrives in Australia for a ten-day visit.
5 May – Three Australian journalists are killed by the Viet Cong in Saigon.
21 May – Indian Prime Minister Indira Gandhi visits Australia.
14 June – Journalist Simon Townsend, future host of Simon Townsend's Wonder World, is granted exemption from military service after lodging a fifth appeal against his imprisonment and court martial for conscientious objection.
18 June – The first stage of the Warringah Freeway opens in Sydney.
24 June – British comedian Tony Hancock commits suicide in his Sydney hotel room.
2 July – Fifty students are arrested during an anti-Vietnam War protest in Martin Place, Sydney.
4 July – Forty five people are arrested during an anti-war protest outside the U.S. consulate in St Kilda Road, Melbourne.
31 July – The Premier of Queensland, Jack Pizzey, dies in office.
1 August – Jack Pizzey's deputy, Gordon Chalk, is sworn in as his successor until the appointment of Joh Bjelke-Petersen as Premier a week later.
3 August – The standard gauge rail line between Perth and Kalgoorlie is completed.
20 August – The National Gallery of Victoria is opened in Melbourne.
14 October – The town of Meckering, Western Australia, is badly damaged by an earthquake.
28 October – The Postmaster-General's Department decreases the number of mail deliveries per day from two to one.
31 October – Minister for the Army Phillip Lynch admits that Australian Army troops may have breached the Geneva Convention by using water torture during the interrogation of a female Viet Cong suspect.
1 November – The airline Ansett-ANA is renamed Ansett.
14 December – A referendum is held in Tasmania to allow the granting of Australia's first casino license to the Wrest Point Hotel. The referendum is passed.
31 December – MacRobertson Miller Airlines Flight 1750 crashes south of Port Hedland, Western Australia, killing all 26 people on board.

Non-specific dates
 Australia's population is estimated to have reached 12 million in 1968.

Arts and literature

17 January – The Seekers are named Australians of the Year for 1967.
19 January – William Pidgeon wins the Archibald Prize with his portrait of Lloyd Rees.
1 July – The Copyright Act 1968 replaces the existing 1911 copyright legislation.
Thomas Keneally's novel Three Cheers for the Paraclete wins the Miles Franklin Award

Film
2 December – At the Australian Film Institute Awards ceremony, Prime Minister John Gorton announces the creation of the Australian Film Development Corporation.

Television
25 May – An episode of the ABC series Bellbird stops the nation when the character of Charlie Cousins (played by Robin Ramsay) dies in a fall from a silo.

Sport
26 February – Boxer Lionel Rose beats Japan's Fighting Harada in Tokyo to become world bantamweight champion.
25 May – Derek Clayton wins his second men's national marathon title, clocking 2:14:47.8 in Hobart.
26 May – Australia wins the 1968 Federation Cup in women's tennis, defeating the Netherlands (3–0).
10 June – Australia wins the 1968 Rugby League World Cup when it beats France (20–2) in the final at the SCG.
21 September – South Sydney defeated Manly-Warringah 13–9 in the NSWRL Grand Final at the Sydney Cricket Ground. Newtown finish in last position, claiming the wooden spoon.
28 September – The Carlton Blues narrowly beat Essendon Bombers by 3 points (56–53) in the grand final of the 1968 VFL season, winning their first flag in 21 years.
12 – 27 October – Australia participates in the 1968 Summer Olympics in Mexico City, coming ninth in the medal tally with 5 gold, 7 silver and 5 bronze medals (17 in total).
15 October – Ralph Doubell equals Peter Snell's world record (2:04.3) in the men's 800 metres, clocking 1:44.3 at the Summer Olympics in Mexico City.
5 November – Rain Lover wins the Melbourne Cup.
26 December – Ondine II takes line honours in the Sydney to Hobart Yacht Race. Koomooloo is the handicap winner

Unknown dates
 Western Australia wins the Sheffield Shield.

Births
 9 January – Mardi Lunn, golfer
 7 February – Phillip Tahmindjis, ice speed skater
 23 February – Angela Ash, Celebrity of Stylis Cove Western Australia
 12 February – Nathan Rees, 41st Premier of New South Wales (2008–2009)
 1 April – Mike Baird, 44th Premier of New South Wales (2014–2017)
 7 April – Duncan Armstrong, swimmer
 20 April – Julia Morris, actress, comedian, television presenter and producer
 13 May – Scott Morrison, 30th Prime Minister of Australia
 26 May – Rachael Sporn, basketball player
 28 May – Kylie Minogue, entertainer
 1 June – Jason Donovan, entertainer
 4 June – Rachel Griffiths, actress
 15 June – Hugh McDermott, politician
 27 July – Julian McMahon, actor
 3 August – Tom Long, actor (died 2020)
 8 August – Craig Ruddy, artist (died 2022)
 9 August – Eric Bana, actor
 13 September – Andrew Gee, politician
 30 September – Sharon Jaklofsky, track and field athlete
 8 October – Garry Hocking, footballer
 12 October – Hugh Jackman, actor
 13 November – Cherie Burton, politician
 19 December – Kristina Keneally, 42nd Premier of New South Wales (2009–2011)

Deaths
 14 January – Dorothea Mackellar (born 1885), poet
 21 February – Howard Florey (born 1898), Nobel Prize-winning pharmacologist
 22 May – Arthur Bridges (born 1901), New South Wales Minister for Child and Social Welfare
 24 June – Tony Hancock (born 1924), British comedian
 31 July – Jack Pizzey (born 1911), Premier of Queensland
 19 August – William McCall (born 1908), politician
 28 September – Sir Norman Brookes (born 1877), tennis player
 10 October – Gavin Long (born 1901), journalist and military historian
 13 October – Dame Jean Macnamara (born 1899), medical scientist
 27 October – James Hunter (born 1882), politician
 20 December – John Jennings (born 1878), politician

See also
 List of Australian films of the 1960s

References

 
Australia
Years of the 20th century in Australia